The Agricultural Refugee Liaison was a political party in Greece in the 1920s.

History
The party first contested national elections in 1926, when they won a single seat in the parliamentary elections with 0.5% of the national vote. However, the party did not contest any further elections.

References

Defunct political parties in Greece
Political parties with year of establishment missing
Political parties with year of disestablishment missing
Agrarian parties in Greece
Defunct agrarian political parties